Astrid is a female given name. 

Astrid may also refer to:

Places
1128 Astrid, an asteroid
Astrid Park, an urban park in Brussels, Belgium

Technology
Astrid (application), a cross-platform to-do list application
ASTRID (reactor), a French Sodium-cooled fast reactor built expected to be built to replace the Phénix reactor
Astrid (satellite), two scientific microsatellites developed by the Swedish Space Corporation
ASTRID, a research particle storage ring at Aarhus, Denmark

Other uses
Astrid (band), a band from the Isle of Lewis
Astrid (brig), a tall ship that sank in July 2013
Astrid (Antwerp premetro station), a station in the Antwerp premetro network
Astrid, an early alias of singer Ameerah
"Astrid", a 2020 song by musician Glaive
Astrid, a fictional starship in Ground Control and Ground Control 2: Operation Exodus

See also
SNCF Class BB 36000 or Astride, a locomotive